Euzopherodes oberleae is a species of snout moth in the genus Euzopherodes. It was described by Roesler in 1973 and is known from Japan.

References

Moths described in 1973
Phycitini
Moths of Japan